Ken Saydak (born Chicago, Illinois, United States) is an American Chicago blues pianist and singer-songwriter. In a long career, he has played as a sideman with Lonnie Brooks, Mighty Joe Young, Johnny Winter and Dave Specter. Saydak has released three albums under his own name since 1999. Billboard once described him as "a gripping frontman".

Biography
During the 1980s, Saydak played on tours and albums by Johnny Winter, including Winter's Grammy Award nominated LP, Guitar Slinger. Following this spell, Saydak became one of the members of the blues rock band, Big Shoulders, who issued two albums (produced by Saydak) before disbanding.

His debut solo album was 1999's Foolish Man released on Delmark Records. Saydak has also produced his own albums, as well as Zora Young's 2000 issue, Learned My Lesson. He has now appeared on over fifty albums.

The Chicago Sun Times reported "Ken Saydak has built an impressive body of work with his three solo albums and his studio work...It's My Soul is his best stand-alone project yet".

Discography

Albums
Foolish Man (1999) – Delmark
Love Without Trust (2001) – Delmark
It's My Soul (2005) – Evidence

Other appearances
1976 – Mighty Joe Young – Mighty Joe Young – Keyboards
1983 – Hot Shot – Lonnie Brooks – Keyboards
1984 – Guitar Slinger – Johnny Winter – Keyboards
1985 – Serious Business – Johnny Winter – Piano
1986 – Third Degree – Johnny Winter – Piano
1988 – The Winter of '88 – Johnny Winter – Keyboards
1990 – Big Shoulders – Big Shoulders – Organ, piano, accordion, vocals
1991 – Nickel History – Big Shoulders – Organ, piano, accordion, vocals
1991 – Bluebird Blues – Dave Specter with Bill Smith – Organ, piano
1991 – Let Me In – Johnny Winter – Piano
1993 – Fortune Tellin' Man – Jesse Fortune – Organ, piano
1994 – Blueplicity – Dave Specter – Organ, piano
1994 – Gotcha! – Barkin' Bill Smith – Piano
1994 – One to Infinity – Tad Robinson – Organ, piano
1995 – Had My Fun – Karen Carroll – Organ, piano
1995 – Sweetheart of the Blues – Bonnie Lee – Organ, piano
1995 – Wild Cards – Al Miller – Organ, piano
1996 – Left Turn on Blue – Dave Specter – Organ
1996 – Long Way to Ol' Miss – Willie Kent – Piano
1996 – Live at Blue Chicago – Johnny B. Moore – Keyboards
1997 – 700 Blues – Lurrie Bell – Organ, Piano
1997 – Troubled World – Johnny B. Moore – Piano
1998 – Blues Spoken Here – Dave Specter and Lenny Lynn – Piano
1998 – Kiss of Sweet Blues – Lurrie Bell – Organ, piano
1998 – Make Room for the Blues – Willie Kent – Electric piano
1998 – Ready – James Wheeler – Piano
1999 – Knockin' at Your Door – John Primer – Organ, piano
2000 – Can't Take It – James Wheeler – Organ, piano
2000 – Learned My Lesson – Zora Young – Organ, piano, producer
2000 – Royal Blue – Koko Taylor – Piano
2000 – Speculatin''' – Dave Specter – Piano
2002 – In the House: Live at Lucerne, Vol. 1 – Bob Stroger – Piano, vocals, producer
2004 – Have a Little Faith – Mavis Staples – Choir, chorus
2004 – Chinatown – Paul Filipowicz – Piano
2008 – Tell Me Why'' – Alex Wilson – Hammond organ

See also
List of Chicago blues musicians

References

External links
Official website

Year of birth missing (living people)
Living people
American blues pianists
American male pianists
American blues singers
American male singer-songwriters
American session musicians
Record producers from Illinois
American blues singer-songwriters
Singer-songwriters from Illinois
Chicago blues musicians
Blues musicians from Illinois
21st-century American keyboardists
21st-century American pianists
21st-century American male musicians